The Black Castle of Moulin (also known as An Sean Chaisteal), is a ruined castle located in Moulin near Pitlochry, Scotland. It is a scheduled monument.

The castle was built about 1326 by Sir John Campbell of Lochawe on an island, or crannog, in a loch, now drained.  The castle was torched in 1512, due to a fear of plague, and fell into ruins.

References

Castles in Perth and Kinross
Ruined castles in Scotland
Scheduled Ancient Monuments in Perth and Kinross
Buildings and structures in Pitlochry